USS Marin may refer to the following ships operated by the United States Navy:

 , was purchased by the Navy 14 November 1940 and placed out of service 18 June 1946
 , was a tugboat launched in April 1960 and struck in 1991

United States Navy ship names